Rethabile is a populated place in the Emalahleni Local Municipality of the Nkangala District Municipality in the Mpumalanga Province of South Africa.

As of the 2011 census, Rethabile had 327 households.

See also
 List of populated places in South Africa

References 

Populated places in the Emalahleni Local Municipality, Mpumalanga